Eremo di Santa Maria del Cauto (Italian for Hermitage of Santa Maria del Cauto) is an hermitage located in Morino, Province of L'Aquila (Abruzzo, Italy).

History

Architecture

References

External links
 

Maria del Cauto
Morino